The 1980 Montana Grizzlies football team represented the University of Montana in the 1980 NCAA Division I-AA football season as a member of the Big Sky Conference (Big Sky). The Grizzlies were led by first-year head coach Larry Donovan, played their home games at Dornblaser Field and finished the season with a record of three wins and seven losses (3–7, 1–6 Big Sky).

Schedule

References

External links
Montana Grizzlies football – 1980 media guide

Montana
Montana Grizzlies football seasons
Montana Grizzlies football